Ocak may refer to:

People
 Ocak (name)

Places
 Ocak, Aziziye
 Ocak, Kemaliye
 Ocak, Pazar

Others
 Adana 5 Ocak Stadium, multi-purpose stadium in Adana, Turkey
 Gaziantep Kamil Ocak Stadium, multi-purpose stadium in Gaziantep, Turkey
 Sönmüş Ocak, Turkish TV series

See also
 Odžak (disambiguation)